S-VOX Foundation was a Canadian non-profit media organization dedicated to producing content on spirituality.

The organization is the successor to the non-profit entity that operated VisionTV, and later other related Canadian speciality channels, from 1988 to 2010. In June 2009, the company announced it would sell its broadcasting assets to ZoomerMedia, a company controlled by Moses Znaimer. The sale was approved by the CRTC on March 30, 2010. ZoomerMedia assumed control of S-VOX's broadcasting assets on June 30, 2010.

After the sale of VisionTV, S-VOX's board of directors undertook to use the funds to found the Inspirit Foundation. Inspirit is a national grant-making organization that supports Canadians, particularly young adults, in building a more inclusive and pluralistic society. One way the foundation does this is by funding initiatives that foster engagement and exchange between young Canadians of different secular, spiritual and religious beliefs.

References

External links
 Inspirit Foundation

Television production companies of Canada
Defunct broadcasting companies of Canada
Mass media companies established in 1998
Mass media companies disestablished in 2010
Non-profit organizations based in Toronto
Religious organizations based in Canada
1998 establishments in Ontario
2010 disestablishments in Ontario